Puerto Rican rapper Daddy Yankee has released 98 music videos (as a lead or a featured act) and one film. His first music videos were directed for various underground mixtapes during the 1990s decade, in which he appeared as guest artist. No videos were filmed for his debut studio album No Mercy (1995). Three clips were filmed for his second studio album El Cangri.com (2002), including "Latigazo", directed by Puerto Rican rapper and producer Eddie Dee, which introduced his music in New York City and Miami in the United States. In 2002, he made a brief appearance in the documentary Big Pun: Still Not a Player.

Four music videos were filmed for Daddy Yankee's third studio album Barrio Fino (2004). Puerto Rican director and designer Carlos Pérez directed videos for "Gasolina", "King Daddy", "No Me Dejes Solo", "Lo Que Pasó, Pasó", "Salud y Vida", and "Corazones". That same year, Daddy Yankee made his acting debut playing Bimbo in the film Vampiros. Pérez and Dominican filmmaker Jessy Terrero directed music videos for "Rompe" and "Gangsta Zone", singles for Daddy Yankee's live album Barrio Fino en Directo (2005). "Rompe" garnered a nomination for an MTV Video Music Award for Best Hip-Hop Video at the 23rd MTV Video Music Awards. Carlos Pérez directed the music videos for "Mensaje de Estado" and "Ella Me Levanto" from the rapper's fourth studio album El Cartel: The Big Boss (2007), while two versions of the single "Impacto" were directed by American filmmakers The Saline Project.

In 2008, Daddy Yankee played the protagonist Edgar "Dinero" in the film Talento de Barrio, in which he also served as executive producer. Four music videos were filmed for the film's soundtrack, including "Pose" and "Somos de Calle", directed by Jessy Terrero and George Rivera, respectively. Between 2009 and 2010, five music videos were shot for his fifth studio album Mundial. Carlos Pérez directed three clips, including "Grito Mundial" and "Descontrol", while George Rivera directed "El Ritmo No Perdona (Prende)" with Louanson Alers and "La Despedida" with Juan Esteban Suárez.

Daddy Yankee's sixth studio album Prestige (2012) spawned eight music videos. Puerto Rican director Carlos Martin shot three of them, including "Lovumba", and Puerto Rican director José "Javy" Ferrer filmed "El Amante". Carlos Pérez directed the clips for "Ven Conmigo" and "Pasarela", while Jessy Terrero handled direction for "Limbo" and "La Noche de Los Dos". Ferrer directed the clip for "La Rompe Carros" and Puerto Rican filmmaker Christian Suau directed "La Nueva y La Ex" from Daddy Yankee's mixtape King Daddy (2013).

In 2017, Daddy Yankee starred in the video for his and Puerto Rican singer Luis Fonsi's collaboration, "Despacito", which was directed by Carlos Pérez and was shot in San Juan, Puerto Rico. The clip is the most-viewed YouTube video since August 2017 and has received more than five billion views on the site. It also became the first YouTube video to receive three, four, and five billion views and the fastest video to reach two billion views in 154 days. The clip garnered a Latin Grammy Award for Best Short Form Music Video at the 18th Latin Grammy Awards and a Billboard Music Award for Top Streaming Song (Video) at the 25th Billboard Music Awards.

Music videos

Upcoming

Filmography

Theatrical feature films

Television films

Television

Video games

See also
Daddy Yankee discography

References

Videographies of Puerto Rican artists
Videography